Zealandia is a national personification of New Zealand. In her stereotypical form, Zealandia appears as an evidently Western European woman who is similar in dress and appearance to Britannia. Britannia is said to be the mother of Zealandia.

History
As a direct reference to the United Kingdom and the old world, she brought a sense of history and classical respectability to the colony during the formative years as a young nation.
Zealandia appeared on postage stamps, posters, cartoons, war memorials, and New Zealand government publications most commonly during the first half of the 20th century. Zealandia was a commonly used symbol of the New Zealand Centennial Exhibition, which was held in Wellington in 1939 and 1940. Four large Zealandia statues exist in New Zealand towns or cities; one is in Waimate, one is in Palmerston, and one in Symonds Street, Auckland, and one inside the Auckland War Museum. The first two (in stone) are Second Boer War memorials and the latter one (in bronze) is a New Zealand Wars memorial. Some smaller statues exist in other museums and in private hands.

Postage stamps

Zealandia also featured on one penny definitive postage stamps issued in 1901 and 1909 during the reign of Queen Victoria and Edward VII when it went from being a Colony to a Dominion and was also depicted on a stamp featuring the coat of arms issued in 1929.

Coat of arms
The woman who appears on the left side of the coat of arms of New Zealand is Zealandia. Apart from the coat of arms, Zealandia is seldom depicted in works today, or indeed referred to.

Image gallery

References

External links

National song: "All Hail! Zealandia!" composed by Robert Peel Crosbie, published in 1885 with a dedication to former premier Sir Julius Vogel.
"Ah, Zealandia – what has become of thee?". "Timespanner" (Avondale Historical Society), 28 January 2009. Retrieved 15 December 2010.

National personifications
National symbols of New Zealand